A Fever You Can't Sweat Out is the debut studio album by American pop rock band Panic! at the Disco. Produced by Matt Squire, the album was released on September 27, 2005, through Decaydance and Fueled by Ramen. The group formed in Las Vegas in 2004 and began posting demos online, which caught the attention of Fall Out Boy bassist Pete Wentz. Wentz signed the group to his own imprint label, Decaydance, without them having ever performed live. It is the only album released during original bassist Brent Wilson's time in the band, but the exact nature of his involvement in the writing and recording process became a source of contention upon his dismissal from the group in mid-2006.

The album was recorded on a small budget at SOMD! Studios in College Park, Maryland over several weeks in June 2005. The group had only graduated from high school one month before. With lyrics written by lead guitarist/backing vocalist Ryan Ross, the album is divided into halves stylistically; the first half is primarily pop-punk with elements of electronic music, while the second half employs more traditional instrumentation, with influences of baroque pop.

Upon its release, A Fever You Can't Sweat Out became a commercial success. Its second single, "I Write Sins Not Tragedies", became a top 10 hit in the United States. It helped bolster the album’s sales to 1.8 million in the US by 2011, making it the group's best-selling release. Despite its sales, the album polarized music critics, with many praising the album's catchiness and others questioning its originality. The band promoted the record with stints on the Nintendo Fusion Tour before its first headlining tour, the Nothing Rhymes with Circus Tour. In late 2015, its certification was upgraded to RIAA double platinum for 2 million shipments.

Background
The band was formed in 2004, at this time named Pet Salamander, in the suburban area of Summerlin, Las Vegas, by childhood friends Ryan Ross on guitar and Spencer Smith on drums. Both teens attended Bishop Gorman High School and they began playing music together in ninth grade. They invited their friend Brent Wilson from nearby Palo Verde High School to join on bass guitar, and Wilson invited his classmate Brendon Urie to try out on guitar. They soon began rehearsing in Smith's grandmother's living room. Urie grew up in a Mormon family in Las Vegas and early on skipped rehearsals to go to church. Ross initially was the lead vocalist for the group, but on hearing Urie singing backing vocals during an early rehearsal, they unanimously decided to move him to lead. They initially worked purely as a Blink-182 cover band.

The monotonous nature of local Las Vegas bands influenced them to be different and creative, and they soon began recording experimental demos. Ross and Urie soon began to record on their laptops the demos they had been developing and posted three early demos ("Time to Dance", "Nails for Breakfast, Tacks for Snacks" and "Camisado") on PureVolume. On a whim, they sent a link to Fall Out Boy bassist Pete Wentz via a LiveJournal account, and around this time they had changed the name of the band to Panic at the Disco. Wentz, who was in Los Angeles at the time with the rest of Fall Out Boy working on their first major-label album, From Under the Cork Tree, drove to Las Vegas to meet the band. On hearing "two to three" songs during band practice, Wentz was impressed and immediately wanted the band to sign to his Fueled by Ramen imprint label Decaydance Records, which made them the first on the new label, which the group did around December 2004. Around this time they had put an exclamation point at the end of Panic as a joke, and as they said in an interview years later, it stuck with them and became the official name of the band.

At the time of their signing, all of the band members were still in high school, with the exception of Ross, who was forced to leave the University of Nevada, Las Vegas.

Recording and production
After completing high school, the group members boarded a van and drove from Las Vegas to College Park, Maryland to record the album. Fueled by Ramen wanted the band to go into the studio earlier in the year, but Ross was attending college at UNLV and the others were still in high school. Urie graduated in May 2005 and the band pushed recording back to June; Smith and Wilson completed school online during production. They picked producer Matt Squire based on his production on several independent albums the group liked. The label had hoped they would pick Mike Green, who had worked with Paramore on All We Know Is Falling. "I think Crush Management and Fueled by Ramen were like, 'Who is this dude?'" said Squire.

A Fever You Can't Sweat Out was created in only "three and a half weeks"—including mixing and mastering—on a budget of $11,000. The group entered the studio with half of the songs completed; the others were crafted in pre-production. Recording was stressful. "We were in the studio for 14 hours a day for five weeks; we might have started losing our minds a little bit," Ross recalled humorously in a 2006 interview. The band lived in a one-bedroom basement studio apartment during the production, with all sleeping in bunk beds. "Everyone got on everybody's nerves," said Ross. "Someone would write a new part for a song and someone else would say they didn't like it just because you ate their cereal that morning." Urie's voice was blown after tracking the album. Squire remembered that most of the album's choruses and high harmonies were recorded in one session. By the end of production, the band hadn't had a day off and were exhausted. After its completion, "We had two weeks to come home and learn how to be a band," Ross said.

In the fallout of Wilson's firing from the band in May 2006 due to "lack of responsibility" and "not progressing musically with the band", the remaining members also alleged that Wilson did not participate in the writing and recording of the album, with Urie and Ross writing bass parts that were simplified so that Wilson could play them live, and Urie recording them in the studio. Wilson denied their statement, insisting that he was present in the studio every day, participating in writing, and teaching Urie how to play certain parts. He also sued the band for 25% of royalties from the album's sales, as stipulated in the original contract.

Composition

The band's debut studio album, A Fever You Can't Sweat Out has been described as pop-punk, emo, alternative rock, emo pop, baroque pop, electronica, dance-punk, and doo-wop. The album is split in two stylistically, with the first half of the record being primarily pop-punk, while additionally using electronic instruments such as synthesizers and drum machines. The second half employs traditional instruments such as the accordion and organ, with heavy baroque pop influences. They are separated by an intermission as a link between the two halves, beginning with techno-style dance beats before switching to a piano interlude. Squire recalled that the band had an "identity crisis" upon writing new songs. The more dance-infused tracks were crafted during the group's time in Vegas, but the band members found themselves writing more straightforward rock tracks when they entered the studio. The band did not want to include the rock songs, but Squire got them to agree to it one day over lunch. "I took them out to lunch and said, "Why don’t we tell the story of that creative evolution as the theme of the album?'", he later recalled.

The ambitious quality of the album's content was representative of the band's desire to "do whatever we wanted," according to Urie.  Urie specifically cited the Beatles, Queen, the Smiths, Name Taken, and the Keane song "Everybody's Changing" as influences on the album. He remarked, "We took all of those biggest influences, listening to them from our parents and mashed them together."

The album's writing is strongly influenced by Chuck Palahniuk's work. The song title "The Only Difference Between Martyrdom and Suicide Is Press Coverage" is a quote from his book Survivor. "Time to Dance" tells the story of Invisible Monsters, and includes quotes such as "Give me envy, give me malice, give me your attention". Other references and quotes can be found throughout the album, such as "Just for the record, the weather today is..." (Diary). Wentz served as an advisor to the group on lyrical content: "he was always there to help out with a line here, a line there," said Urie. The group noticed that bands in the pop punk scene, such as Fall Out Boy and Name Taken, were using long song titles. The band decided to take this a step further, creating increasingly long titles partially as an inside joke. The song "I Constantly Thank God for Esteban" was a reference to an infomercial for Esteban Guitars the group found humorous.

Commercial performance
Sales of the album began relatively slow. It debuted at No. 112 on the Billboard 200 album chart, and later peaked at number 13. The album sold over two million copies in the United States. It spent 88 weeks on the Billboard 200.

Reception

A Fever You Can't Sweat Out divided music critics at the time of its release. Billboard, ten years after its release, deemed it "one of the most polarizing albums of our time". Cory D. Byrom of Pitchfork was perhaps the most negative, criticizing the state of contemporary emo and bemoaning the album's apparent lack of "sincerity, creativity, or originality". Johnny Loftus of AllMusic was similarly negative, writing, "This is a band in love with making a record — making a statement — but there's nothing unique inside, neither in their formula nor the vaunted and sticky production." Lauren Gitlin of Rolling Stone complimented the album's sound, commenting, "What makes Panic different (and excellent) is their use of dance-floor synths and roboto drums, which redeems the album's whininess." Kerrang! was positive, awarding the record four out of five stars. Rolling Stone also gave a positive review, with three and a half stars out of five. Webzines like Gigwise and Sputnikmusic also gave positive reviews.

The hit single "I Write Sins Not Tragedies" received massive airplay and Panic! at the Disco won "Video of the Year" on the annual MTV Video Music Awards in 2006, beating fellow nominees Madonna, Christina Aguilera, Shakira and Red Hot Chili Peppers. In September 2011, "I Write Sins Not Tragedies" won MTV's Best Music Video of the 2000s as well as Best Music Video of All Time based on online voting.

Accolades
Rolling Stone listed it among the "40 Greatest Emo Albums of All Time" in 2016, with James Montgomery dubbing it a "genre-defying blueprint" and commenting "it's difficult to argue that it's not a snapshot of where "emo" was at in 2005, right down to the sentence-long song titles."

Deluxe edition re-issue
On November 14, 2006, the album was re-released in a "deluxe" edition (Limited Edition Collectible Deluxe Box), packaged in a cigar box-shaped box set. The box set was limited to 25,000 copies. It included the original album on CD, a live concert titled Live in Denver on DVD, tarot cards for each song with lyrics printed on individual cards, 2006 tour program, poster of the band, live photo shots, a phenakistoscope, circus-styled mask, fake newspaper article and a blank notebook. The Live in Denver DVD was filmed in Denver on July 22, 2006.

Track listing

Original release

Japanese edition

Personnel
Credits for A Fever You Can't Sweat Out, adapted from AllMusic.

Panic! at the Disco
 Brendon Urie – lead vocals, rhythm guitar, bass guitar, keyboards, piano, synthesizers
 Ryan Ross – lead guitar, backing vocals, synthesizers, programming, organ, accordion, creative direction
 Spencer Smith – drums, percussion
 Brent Wilson – bass guitar [credit only]
 Jon Walker – bass guitar, keyboards, backing vocals (on Live in Denver tracks)
Additional musicians
 Heather Stebbins – cello, double bass
 William Brousserd – trumpet
 Samantha Bynes – violin

Production
 Alan Ferguson – photography
 UE Nastasi – mastering
 Panic! at the Disco - additional production
 Matt Squire – production, engineer, mixing, audio production

Charts

Weekly charts

Year-end charts

Certifications

Notes

References

External links

 A Fever You Can't Sweat Out at YouTube (streamed copy where licensed)
 

2005 debut albums
Panic! at the Disco albums
Fueled by Ramen albums
Albums produced by Matt Squire